The Rural Municipality of South Cypress is a former rural municipality (RM) in the Canadian province of Manitoba. It was originally incorporated as a rural municipality on December 22, 1883. It ceased on January 1, 2015 as a result of its provincially mandated amalgamation with the Village of Glenboro to form the Municipality of Glenboro – South Cypress.

The former RM is located in the Westman Region of the province and contains most of Spruce Woods Provincial Park and most of Spruce Woods Provincial Forest. The 2006 census reported a population of 834.

Communities 
Ashdown
Aweme
Skalholt
Stockton
Treesbank

References

External links 
 
 South Cypress, MB Community Profile
 Map of South Cypress R.M. at Statcan

South Cypress
Populated places disestablished in 2015
2015 disestablishments in Manitoba